World Open may refer to:

 Carling World Open, a professional golf tournament held from 1953 until 1967
 Casio World Open, a professional golf tournament held in Japan since 1981
 Sarazen World Open, a professional golf tournament held from 1994 until 1999
 World Open Golf Championship, a professional golf tournament held from 1973 until 1982
 World Open (squash), a squash event which serves as the individual world championship for squash players
 World Open (snooker), a professional ranking snooker tournament
 World Open chess tournament, an annual open chess tournament played in the United States
 World Poker Open, one of the annual events on the World Poker Tour
 World Wide Open, the debut album of the American country music band Love and Theft